The 1988 Arizona State Sun Devils football team was an American football team that represented Arizona State University in the Pacific-10 Conference (Pac-10) during the 1988 NCAA Division I-A football season. In their first season under head coach Larry Marmie, the Sun Devils compiled a 6–5 record (3–4 against Pac-10 opponents), finished in fifth place in the Pac-10, and were outscored by their opponents by a combined total of 277 to 192.

The team's statistical leaders included Daniel Ford with 1,166 passing yards, Bruce Perkins with 446 rushing yards, and Leland Adams with 420 receiving yards.

Schedule

Personnel

Season summary

at Arizona

References

Arizona State
Arizona State Sun Devils football seasons
Arizona State Sun Devils football